Montie Morton Weaver (professionally known as Monte Weaver) (June 15, 1906 – June 14, 1994) was a Major League Baseball player who played as a pitcher from 1931 to 1939.  

Weaver was born June 15, 1906, in Helton, North Carolina.  

A 1927 graduate of Emory and Henry College, Weaver went on to earn a master’s degree and teach mathematics at the University of Virginia. He played in the minor leagues for the Durham Bulls in Durham, North Carolina, and was called up by the Washington Senators during the 1931 season. 

In 1932, Weaver went 22-10 as a rookie in his first full season, but never won more than 12 games in any subsequent season. In 1939, his final season in the big leagues, he played for the Boston Red Sox.

In 1972, Emory and Henry College inducted him into its Sports Hall of Fame.

Weaver died on June 14, 1994, one day before his 88th birthday.

References

External links

Interview with Monte Weaver conducted by Eugene Murdock on January 1, 1980, in Orlando, Florida: Part 1, Part 2

1906 births
1994 deaths
Boston Red Sox players
Emory and Henry Wasps baseball players
Major League Baseball pitchers
People from Ashe County, North Carolina
Washington Senators (1901–1960) players